B47 or B-47 may refer to:
 BMW B47, an inline-four diesel engine
 Bundesstraße 47, a German road
 B47 (New York City bus) in Brooklyn
 HLA-B47, a HLA-B serotype
 B-47 Stratojet, an American aircraft